Brendan Michael O'Brien (born September 28, 1943) is a Canadian prelate of the Roman Catholic Church. He served as Archbishop of Kingston from 2007 to 2019. He was previously Archbishop of St. John's (Newfoundland) and Bishop of Pembroke (Ontario).

Early life and ministry

Brendan Michael O'Brien was born in Ottawa, the oldest of the seven children of Redmond and Margaret (née Foran) O'Brien. He attended the University of Ottawa and St. Paul University, from where he earned his licentiates in philosophy and theology, before being ordained to the priesthood on June 1, 1968, at St George's Church (Ottawa).

Father O'Brien then did pastoral work in Ottawa and served as Co-Director of the Diocesan Synod. In 1971 he went to Rome, where he studied at the Pontifical Lateran University's Accademia Alfonsianum, from which he obtained a doctorate in moral theology. O'Brien, upon his return to Canada in 1975, taught at his alma mater of St. Paul University and served as pastor of an Ottawa parish.

Episcopate
On May 6, 1987, O'Brien was appointed Auxiliary Bishop of Ottawa and Titular Bishop of Numana by Pope John Paul II. He received his episcopal consecration on the following June 29 from Archbishop Joseph-Aurèle Plourde, with Bishops John Beahen and Gilles Bélisle serving as co-consecrators. O'Brien was later named Bishop of Pembroke on May 5, 1993, and Archbishop of St. John's on December 4, 2000.

Pope Benedict XVI, on June 3, 2007, named O'Brien to succeed the late Anthony G. Meagher as Archbishop of Kingston. O'Brien's installation as Kingston's ordinary took place on July 25, 2007.

He was once State Chaplain for the Knights of Columbus in Ontario. From 2003 to 2005, he was President of the Canadian Episcopal Conference, of which he currently sits on the Social Affairs Commission.

References

External links
Archdiocese of St. John's

1943 births
21st-century Roman Catholic archbishops in Canada
Canadian people of Irish descent
Living people
Roman Catholic archbishops of St. John's, Newfoundland
Clergy from Ottawa
University of Ottawa alumni
Roman Catholic archbishops of Kingston, Canada
Roman Catholic bishops of Ottawa–Cornwall
Roman Catholic bishops of Pembroke